Charles Mark Lichenstein (September 20, 1926 – August 22, 2002) was the American alternate representative for special political affairs to the United Nations, the second highest ranking American diplomat at the United Nations, from 1981 to 1984. Lichenstein is best remembered for controversial comments that he made welcoming the possibility of relocating the United Nations headquarters outside of the United States.

Career

Charles Lichenstein was the primary ghostwriter for Richard Nixon's book Six Crises, published in 1962.

Lichenstein was staff assistant to Robert Finch during the Nixon administration, and an assistant to Dean Burch during the Ford administration.

From 1975 to 1979, Lichenstein was senior vice president of PBS.

In 1981, Lichenstein was appointed by Ronald Reagan as the American alternate representative for special political affairs to the United Nations, serving as a deputy to America's chief UN Ambassador Jeane Kirkpatrick. Lichenstein left his UN job in 1984 to become a distinguished fellow with the Heritage Foundation. He remained a strong critic of the United Nations and a proponent of UN reform in his Heritage Foundation post and served on numerous UN efficiency and effectiveness committees.  Lichenstein told the Associated Press in 1995: "The original purpose of the United Nations was the fanciful hope that you could deter conflicts, and sometimes, if that failed, you could bring them to a conclusion. It was a hope, a dream, for which the basis never existed in 1945 or 1995 or anywhere in between."

Lichenstein held his Heritage Foundation post until his death in 2002.

Comments after KAL shootdown
Lichenstein is best remembered for comments he made following the Soviet shootdown of Korean Air Lines Flight 007, after which the states of New York and New Jersey denied Soviet Aircraft permission to land, in violation of the United Nations Charter that requires the host nation to allow all member countries access to the UN.

The United States [Federal Government], which opposed the [New York and New Jersey] legislation, offered the Soviet Union landing rights at a military base so its foreign minister, Andrei A. Gromyko, could fly in for the General Assembly meeting. But the Soviets refused. When the United Nations committee met to review the situation, the Soviet delegate, Igor I. Yakovlev, said the ban on landing "raises the question of whether the United Nations should be in the United States." A furious Mr. Lichenstein replied that if member states felt "they are not being treated with the hostly consideration that is their due," they should consider "removing themselves and this organization from the soil of the United States. We will put no impediment in your way," he continued, "The members of the U.S. mission to the United Nations will be down at the dockside waving you a fond farewell as you sail off into the sunset."

Due to opposition to these remarks by the State Department, Lichenstein offered his resignation.  It was not accepted. President Reagan instead responded with this statement that endorsed Lichenstein's controversial remarks:

Maybe all those delegates should have six months in Moscow and then six months in New York, and it would give them an opportunity to see two ways of life. I think the gentleman [Charles Lichenstein] who spoke the other day had the hearty approval of most people in America in his suggestion that we weren’t asking anyone to leave, but if they chose to leave, good-bye.Lewis, Paul. "Charles M. Lichenstein, 75, American Envoy at the U.N.," New York Times, August 22, 2002

References

1926 births
2002 deaths